An abrogative referendum on the electoral law was held in Italy on 18 April 1999. Voters were asked whether they approved of replacing the mixed-member proportional representation electoral system (in which 75% of seats in Parliament were elected in single-member constituencies and 25% by compensatory proportional representation) with one based solely on single-member constituencies, with the 25% of seats instead allocated to the second-placed in the constituencies with the most votes. The proposal was supported by larger parties, but opposed by smaller ones. Although the proposal was approved by 92% of voters, turnout was only 49.58%, resulting in the referendum being invalidated as the threshold of 50% was not passed.

Results

References

Italy
Referendum
Referendums in Italy
Italy